Bungin Tambun II is a village in Padang Guci Hulu district, Kaur Regency in Bengkulu province and is one of three villages in the district with the name "Bungin Tambun". Its population is 855.

Climate
Bungin Tambun II has a cool tropical rainforest climate (Af) due to altitude with heavy rainfall year-round.

References

Villages in Bengkulu